Croatian Institute of Public Health (HZJZ) is the national institute of public health of Croatia. It operates under the budget of the Ministry of Health.

The institute was first founded in 1893.

References

External links
 

1893 establishments in Croatia
Medical and health organizations based in Croatia
Organizations based in Zagreb
Gornji Grad–Medveščak